Jawahar Navodaya Vidyalya, Jaipur (जवाहर नवोदय विद्यालय, जयपुर) is a Central Board for Secondary Education-affiliated school in the district of Jaipur, in the Jaipur region of Navodaya Vidyalaya Samiti. One of 598 JNVS known for its academics, it is spread all over India by the government of India. It is located near Kotputali on NH 8 Paota (Jaipur-Delhi Highway) which is 75 km from jaipur.

Background
The school is located near the village of Paota in the Jaipur district. The school is residential and all  facilities are free of cost from everyday needs to all educational needs. The school was established on a temporary site in 1986. The school now has buildings for classrooms, hostels, staff quarters, and a multi-purpose hall. There is a Rajiv Smriti Van in the very center of the school which adds to its bio-diversity. A local seasonal river passes through Rajiv Smriti Van.

The elliptical area of Rajiv Smriti Van is surrounded by a road with two bridges to cross the river. The road connects all the buildings with each other.

JNV Jaipur have awarded the status of the Smart School in Jaipur Region. The status is given to the Top Ten Schools of India.

The entrance test for admission into 6th and 9th class of Jawahar Navodaya Vidyalaya, Paota is conducted by the Navodaya Vidyalaya Samiti. The school syllabus is Central Board of Secondary Education pattern. There are classes from 6th standard to 12th standard.

Music, Computer science and SUPW are taught as optional subjects. The school has a computer room equipped with Internet and a music room with instruments available.

Cluster
The Navodaya Vidyalaya comes under Sawaimadhopur 1st  cluster in Jaipur region of Navodaya Vidyalaya Samiti.

Migration
Under migration scheme the 30% students of 9th class migrated to Jamnagar, Gujrat Third language is accordingly Gujarati.

Address

 Jawahar Navodaya Vidyalaya, (Navodaya Road  near Powerhouse)
 Paota, District- Jaipur
 PIN- 303106, Rajasthan

References

External links
 JNV Jaipur website
 JNV Hisar website
 Navodaya Vidyalaya Samiti website
 Navodaya Vidyalaya Samiti, Jaipur

Jawahar Navodaya Vidyalayas in Rajasthan
Jaipur district
Educational institutions established in 1986
1986 establishments in Rajasthan